Mike Martin may refer to:

Sports
Mike Martin (baseball coach) (born 1944), former minor league baseball player and former head coach for the Florida State Seminoles
Mike Martin Jr. (born 1973), son of the above and current head coach for the Florida State Seminoles
Mike Martin (catcher) (born 1958), former baseball catcher for the Chicago Cubs
Mike Martin (wide receiver) (born 1960), former wide receiver in NFL
Mike Martin (basketball, born 1974), member of the BBL's Guildford Heat
Mike Martin (basketball, born 1982), head coach of Brown University men's basketball team
Mike Martin (defensive lineman) (born 1990), University of Michigan/Tennessee Titans American football player
Mike Martin (Canadian football) (born 1940), Canadian football player

Others
Mike Martin (American guitarist) (born 1974), American guitarist, composer & producer
Mike Martin (musician), member of All That Remains band
Mike Martin (politician) (born 1952), former member of the Texas House of Representatives
Mike Martin (character), a fictional SAS officer in Frederick Forsyth's books The Fist of God and The Afghan

See also
Michael Martin (disambiguation)